Progression may refer to:

In mathematics:
 Arithmetic progression, sequence of numbers such that the difference of any two successive members of the sequence is a constant
 Geometric progression, sequence of numbers such that the quotient of any two successive members of the sequence is a constant
 Harmonic progression (mathematics), sequence of numbers such that their reciprocals form an arithmetic progression

In music:
 Chord progression, series of chords played in order
 Backdoor progression, the cadential chord progression from iv7 to I, or flat-VII7 to I in jazz music theory
 Omnibus progression, sequence of chords which effectively divides the octave into 4 equal parts
 Ragtime progression, chord progression typical of ragtime music and parlour music genres
 Progression, music software for guitarists
 Progression, Markus Schulz's second Artist Album, released in 2007

In other fields:
 Age progression, the process of modifying a photograph of a person to represent the effect of aging on their appearance
 Cisternal progression, theory of protein transport through the Golgi apparatus inside a cell
 Color progression, ranges of color whose values transition smoothly through a hue, saturation, luminance, or any combination of the three
 Horizontal progression, the gradual movement from left to right during writing a line of text in Western handwriting
 A progressive tax is a tax by which the tax rate increases as the taxable amount increases
 Semantic progression, evolution of word usage
 Educational progression, an individual's movement through stages of education and/or training
 Progress tracking in video games
 Astrological progression, used in Horoscopic astrology to forecast future trends and developments.

See also
 Progress (disambiguation)